Mariño is a municipality of Isla Margarita in the state of Nueva Esparta, Venezuela. The capital is Porlamar.

Municipalities of Nueva Esparta
Margarita Island